The Immediate Geographic Region of Capelinha is one of the 7 immediate geographic regions in the Intermediate Geographic Region of Teófilo Otoni, one of the 70 immediate geographic regions in the Brazilian state of Minas Gerais and one of the 509 of Brazil, created by the National Institute of Geography and Statistics (IBGE) in 2017.

Municipalities 
It comprises 10 municipalities.

 Água Boa   
 Angelândia 
 Aricanduva     
 Capelinha    
 Chapada do Norte     
 Itamarandiba     
 Leme do Prado     
 Minas Novas     
 Turmalina     
 Veredinha

See also 

 List of Intermediate and Immediate Geographic Regions of Minas Gerais

References 

Geography of Minas Gerais